The 2011 USC Trojans football team represented the University of Southern California in the 2011 NCAA Division I FBS college football season. The Trojans were led by head coach Lane Kiffin in his second season. They played their home games at the Los Angeles Memorial Coliseum and are members of the South Division of the Pac-12 Conference. After a triple-overtime loss to Stanford, the Trojans won their last four games, including a 50–0 win over rival UCLA in the regular-season finale.  USC ended their season ranked No. 6 in the AP Poll with a 10–2 record overall and finished first in the South Division with a 7–2 record in Pac-12 play. However, as part of a post-season ban mandated by the NCAA, the Trojans could not participate in the conference championship game or play in a bowl game. USC concluded their season with two thousand-yard receivers (Robert Woods and Marqise Lee), a thousand-yard rusher (Curtis McNeal), and a 3,000-yard passer (Matt Barkley) for the first time since the 2005 season, when Kiffin served as offensive coordinator.

Coaching staff

Schedule

Game summaries

Minnesota

    
    
    
    
    
    

Robert Woods caught 17 passes – the most ever for a USC player – gained 177 yards, and had 3 touchdowns as USC defeated Minnesota 19–17 on September 3. Quarterback Matt Barkley also set a USC record by completing 34 passes during the game; Barkley had 45 attempts and finished with 304 yards passing. Despite those offensive records, Minnesota nearly completed a second half comeback. After trailing 19–3 at the half, Minnesota kept the Trojans scoreless in the second half. The Golden Gophers narrowed USC's lead to 2 points with 8:03 left in the game when their backup quarterback, Max Shortell, passed the ball to Brandon Green for a touchdown. Minnesota prevented USC from scoring on the ensuing possession. On their final possession, Minnesota started their drive at their own 9-yard line with 2:04 left to play. Cornerback Torin Harris intercepted a pass by Shortell to end the threat and preserve the win for USC.

After the game, the Pac-12 Conference named Woods as its offensive player of the week. In addition to his record-breaking 17 receptions, Woods returned three kickoffs for 73 yards.

Utah

    
    
    
    
    
    

The contest between USC and Utah, the first between the two teams since Utah's win in the 2001 Las Vegas Bowl, was the first conference game in the history of the new Pac-12.  A game between California and Colorado was scheduled earlier in the day, but since the game was scheduled as a non-conference game years ahead of time, it did not count as a conference game in the official standings.

The Trojans pulled ahead in the first quarter 10 to zero, but Utah scored two touchdowns off of USC turnovers to close the gap to 17–14.  The fourth quarter remained scoreless until the final seconds, when the Utes lined up for a 41-yard field goal to tie.  The kick was blocked by Matt Kalil and recovered by Torin Harris, who returned it for a touchdown.  The USC sideline rushed the field, which netted the team an unsportsmanlike conduct penalty.  Though such penalties are dead-ball fouls and are assessed on the following play, the officials erroneously negated the touchdown and the final score was initially reported as 17–14.

Two hours after the game ended, Pac-12 officials corrected the score to 23–14.  The correction was particularly significant for gambling, as the nine-point victory allowed the Trojans to narrowly edge the 8.5 point spread.  Some bettors were able to cash in on either score, while some were limited to the original score, depending on casino house rules.

Syracuse

Source:

Arizona State

USC had won the last 11 meetings, with Arizona State last defeating USC in 1999.  In this game, USC led 22–21 in the third quarter, but Arizona State then scored 22 unanswered points to win 43–22.

Arizona

California

    
    
    
    
    
    
    
    

USC pulled out to a 20–0 halftime lead over the Golden Bears. Matt Barkley threw two touchdowns in the first half, to Brandon Carswell and Marqise Lee. USC tested out the No. 1 national wide receiver recruit George Farmer at running back. He gained 4 yards on 4 carries and caught 1 pass for 14 yards in the game. In the second half, Cal quarterback Zach Maynard, who struggled in the first half, heated up a little bit. He ran for a 3-yard touchdown, but it was not nearly close enough to outscore the Trojans. USC won by a final score of 30–9. Barkley finished with 195 yards and 2 touchdowns, Curtis McNeal lit up the Golden Bears defense for 86 yards and a touchdown, Lee caught 4 passes for 81 yards and a touchdown. USC star receiver Robert Woods only finished with 36 yards.

Notre Dame

Stanford

Colorado

    
    
    
    
    
    
    
    
    

Colorado jumped off to a surprising lead after a Toney Clemons 37-yard touchdown pass from Tyler Hansen. USC then scored 28 unanswered points in the 1st half. Matt Barkley threw all 4 touchdowns in the first half. Two were to freshman wide receiver Marqise Lee (33 and 25 yards), one to freshman tight end Xavier Grimble (5 yards), and one to sophomore superstar Robert Woods (15 yards). Colorado kicker Will Oliver added a 30-yard field goal right before the half. At halftime, USC led 28–10. In the third, Barkley hit Woods again for a 45-yard bomb that put the Trojans up 35–10. Clemons and Hansen connected again in the 4th quarter, followed by a 19-yard screen pass to USC freshman running back Amir Carlisle that sealed the win for the Trojans. Barkley broke the all-time USC record in this game for most touchdown passes in a single game with 6. He finished 25/39 with 318 yards, 6 touchdowns, and 1 INT. USC running backs Curtis McNeal and Carlisle picked up the slack with normal tailback Marc Tyler out. Both had 10 carries, with McNeal picking up 90 yards and Carlisle getting 86. Woods and Lee were amazing though with 9 catches and 2 touchdowns each! Woods finished with 130 yards, while Lee tallied 124 yards. USC climbed to a 7–2 record, with a 4–2 record in the Pac-12. Colorado still has not picked up a conference win as they fell to 1–9 (0–6).

Washington

    
    
    
    
    
    
    
    
    
    

After Southern California lost to Washington on last-gasp field goals in each of the last two years, the Trojans made sure the final seconds of the latest meeting did not matter at all. Marqise Lee caught a touchdown pass and returned the second-half kickoff 88 yards for a score, and Curtis McNeal had a 79-yard touchdown sprint among his career-high 148 yards rushing in USC's 40–17 victory over Washington.  Matt Barkley passed for 174 yards and one touchdown while running for an early score for the Trojans, who made sure Huskies kicker Erik Folk played no significant role, as he did in each of Washington coach Steve Sarkisian's first two meetings with his former employer.

Oregon

This was the Trojans first win in the state of Oregon since the 2005 season.

UCLA

    
    
    
    
    
    
    

Matt Barkley tied his own school record by once again completing six touchdown passes and surpassed the conference record for total touchdown passes in a season with 39 total.  He passed for 423 yards, completing 35 of 42 passes (83.3 percent), and no interceptions.  Robert Woods set the conference's single-season receptions record while catching 12 passes for 113 yards and two touchdowns.  True freshman Marqise Lee had 13 catches for 224 yards and two touchdowns. Meanwhile, Curtis McNeal rushed for 124 yards and a touchdown on 12 carries (10.3 avg) to eclipse 1,000 yards on the season.  This marked the first time that USC had two thousand yard receivers, a three-thousand yard passer, and a thousand-yard rusher since 2005, when Kiffin was the offensive coordinator.  The Trojans' defensive effort was led by safety T. J. McDonald, who had a game-high 10 tackles, including one for loss, a pass breakup, and an interception that he returned for 25 yards.  Cornerback Nickell Robey, linebacker Hayes Pullard, and safety Jawanza Starling each had nine tackles.  Robey also had two sacks and two pass breakups.

The Trojans, who finished first in the South Division, were not eligible for the post-season due to NCAA-imposed sanctions, so the Bruins were declared the South Division champions.

Rankings

Depth chart

Notes
 May 26, 2011 – NCAA upheld all findings and penalties against USC in their infractions case on former players Reggie Bush and O. J. Mayo. The USC football team will not participate in this season's Pac-12 Football Championship Game and  bowl games.
 July 18, 2011 – Running back Marc Tyler has been suspended for the season opener against Minnesota for making inappropriate comments to the media.
 October 25, 2011 – Sophomore running back Dillon Baxter is no longer a member of the football team, however he is still being supported by USC Academic Support Services.
 November 27, 2011 – Lane Kiffin announces that Dillon Baxter will no longer be a member of the football program moving forward. Baxter is expected to transfer.
December 4, 2011 – USC is ranked No. 5 in the AP Poll despite being on NCAA probation.

References

External links

USC
USC Trojans football seasons
USC Trojans football